Keith Bryant (born in Virginia) is an American country music artist. In his career, he has released four independent studio albums, including one on Lofton Creek Records. He charted for the first time in 2004 with the single "Riding' with the Legend", which Bryant co-wrote as a tribute to former NASCAR driver Dale Earnhardt, who died in 2001. The song peaked at number 47 on the Hot Country Songs chart, becoming his first, and only charted single to date.

Biography
Keith Bryant was born in the state of Virginia. By age fifteen, he had formed his own gospel band and began teaching himself piano. From there, he began playing in local bands as well. Bryant won best male vocalist at age 19 in the East Coast Country Music Championship, and then formed a band called Ironhorse.

In 2000, Bryant released his first solo album, The Secret to Life. Robert K. Oermann of MusicRow magazine gave the album a favorable review, awarding it the magazine's DISCovery award. A second album, Welcome to Love, followed two years later. By 2004, he had signed to Lofton Creek Records to release his third album, Ridin' with the Legend. Its title track was a tribute to Dale Earnhardt, a NASCAR driver who died in 2001. The song received airplay on country radio for ten months, in addition to spending fifteen weeks on the Billboard Hot Country Songs charts, where it peaked at No. 47. The album also sold more than 30,000 copies. "Ridin' with the Legend" was also made into a music video which aired on CMT and GAC. Bryant's fourth album, Live It Slow, followed in 2007 on the S&S Mack label. This album produced five singles, though none charted.

Discography

Albums

Singles

Music videos

References

External links
Official website

American country singer-songwriters
Living people
Singer-songwriters from Virginia
Lofton Creek Records artists
Year of birth missing (living people)